Trecchi Castle is a 15th-century fortress located in Maleo, Province of Lodi, Lombardy, Italy. 

The construction of the building is attributed to architect Pellegrino Tibaldi. The castle was transformed into a country villa over time.

History 
 1532-1560: construction with moat and flanking towers.
 1567: Bernardino Campi designed the painted decoration of the vault of the octagonal chapel of the hall of Olympus, the Apollo chamber, and the hall of Poseidon.
 1645: The castle became the property of the Marquis of Giovan Battista Trecchi, and remained in the possession of the family of Cremona until the 1970s, when it was sold.

References

 Vedi la tesi di laurea di Gaia Polo, L’attività milanese di Bernardino Campi, Parma, Anno Acc. 2001-2002
 R. Miller, in I Campi. Cultura artistica cremonese del 500, a cura di M. Gregori, Milano 1985, pp. 154–170 Painting in Italy 
 Corrierre della seara (IT)

Castles in Lombardy
Buildings and structures in the Province of Lodi